Kata (or more traditionally, 型; lit. "form") is a Japanese word describing detailed patterns of movements practiced either solo or in pairs. Karate kata are executed as a specified series of a variety of moves, with stepping and turning, while attempting to maintain perfect form. The kata is not intended as a literal depiction of a mock fight, but as a display of transition and flow from one posture and movement to another, teaching the student proper form and position, and encouraging them to visualise different scenarios for the use of each motion and technique. Karateka "read" a kata in order to explain the imagined events, a practice known as bunkai. There are various kata, each with many minor variations.

Origins
Kata originated from the practice of paired attack and defence drills by ancient Chinese martial artists, these were known as the "five form fists" or "five patterns" after the fighting methods of five different animals. These were brought to Okinawa and were later used as the foundations for new kata to be devised.

Kata were created as solo forms containing the concatenated sequences of movements of the defensive portions of the drills. The initial forms being simply strings of movements, sets of rules were created to allow the creation of kata which could fit comfortably within training spaces.

Teaching
Traditionally, kata are taught in stages. Previously learned kata are repeated to show better technique or power as a student acquires knowledge and experience. It is common for students testing to repeat every kata they have learned but at an improved level of quality.

The various styles of karate study different kata, or variations of a common core. Some kata may therefore be known by two names, one in Japanese, the other in Okinawan or Chinese. This is because Gichin Funakoshi, and others, renamed many kata to help Karate spread throughout Japan.

Kata names

Chinese connections 
The number 108 has mythological significance in Dharmic religions and is present in a number of traditional kata. This number also figures prominently in the names of Karate kata, predominantly those with an origin in Naha-te, including Goju-ryu. The advanced Gōjū-ryū kata, Suparinpei, literally translates in Fuzhounese to the number 108, while gojushi of Gojūshiho is the Japanese pronunciation of the number 54 (half of 108). The other Gōjū-ryū kata, Sanseru (meaning "36") and Seipai ("18") are factors of the number 108. 

However this direct connection between Zen Buddhism and karate particularly has been discredited in recent times as both a modern Western misinterpretation and as part of a tendency towards nationalist religious homogenisation in the early unified Japan of the late 19th century. Other propositions for the origin of the number 108 in kata include the legendary story of Outlaws of the Marsh (of which there were 108), or from Yue Fei, a 12th century Chinese general who created the Yibai Lingba Qinna (一百零八擒拿; "108 Locking Hand Techniques") of the Ying Sao (Eagle Hands) or Ying Kuen (Eagle Fist) which evolved into modern Chinese boxing that karate was influenced by.

Kata performed in various styles
Some kata and/or styles are not included here, due but not limited to popularity and common usage for kata, and recognition (or not) of styles by the various governing bodies.

See also

Bunkai 
Kime
Comparison of karate styles
Hyeong
Kihon

References